Acioa edulis of the family Chrysobalanaceae.  (The tree's Portuguese common name: Castanha-de-cutia; syn. Couepia edulis (Prance) Prance) is a fruit and timber tree, which is native of Amazon Rainforest vegetation in Brazil.  The trees grow naturally only within a small area of Brazil. However, they proliferate widely within this area. The tree is around 25 meters (82 feet) tall, with entire leaves that are oval or round, measuring three or four inches (8 to 10 centimeters) in diameter, with a petiole up to one inch (2.5 centimeters) in length.  Its fruits range from 8-9 centimeters (3 to 3.5 inches) in length and 4-5 centimeters (1.75 to 2 inches) in diameter. and contain a single nut.  Later these nuts float on the waters and have been collected for centuries  as the source of a valuable oil, but their source was unknown until 1978 when botanical explorer Ghillean Prance discovered the species of tree which produces them.

Cultivation
The fruit is edible or can be pressed to extract oil used in cooking or soap making.  The kernel is also edible.

See also
List of plants of Amazon Rainforest vegetation of Brazil

References

External links
 Acioa edulis wood photo

Chrysobalanaceae
Trees of Brazil
Trees of the Amazon
Tropical fruit